My Eye for a Camera (French: Mon oeil pour une caméra) is a 2001 autofiction movie by Quebec film director Denys Desjardins.  This length feature is produced by the National Film Board of Canada (NFB).

Plot
Fascinated by the power of the camera and obsessed with the theories of Russian film pioneer Dziga Vertov, a filmmaker decides to get a camera eye to replace the real eye he lost as a child. This visionary quest begins on the operating table where a surgeon grafts a prototype ocular implant into his eye socket. Seeking a microscopic camera that could be incorporated into his artificial eye so he could secretly film whatever he sees, the filmmaker explores the futuristic technology that could make this possible, while revisiting chapters of his own past.

Cast
 Denys Desjardins
 Steve Mann
 Boris Lehman
 David R. Jordan

Award
 Nominated in 2003 for a Jutra Award for Best Documentary.

External links
NFB Web page
Web site
 

2001 films
Canadian documentary films
National Film Board of Canada documentaries
Films about filmmaking
Films directed by Denys Desjardins
Autobiographical documentary films
2001 documentary films
French-language Canadian films
2000s Canadian films